The 1993–94 Connecticut Huskies men's basketball team represented the University of Connecticut in the 1993–94 collegiate men's basketball season. The Huskies completed the season with a 29–5 overall record. The Huskies were members of the Big East Conference where they finished with a 16–2 record and were the Regular Season Champions. They made it to the Sweet Sixteen in the 1994 NCAA Division I men's basketball tournament. The Huskies played their home games at Harry A. Gampel Pavilion in Storrs, Connecticut and the Hartford Civic Center in Hartford, Connecticut, and they were led by eighth-year head coach Jim Calhoun.

Schedule 

|-
!colspan=12 style=""| Regular Season

|-
!colspan=12 style=""| Big East tournament

|-
!colspan=12 style=""| NCAA tournament

Schedule Source:

References 

UConn Huskies men's basketball seasons
Connecticut Huskies
Connecticut
1993 in sports in Connecticut
1994 in sports in Connecticut